YTL Corporation Berhad is a Malaysian infrastructure conglomerate, founded in 1955 by Yeoh Tiong Lay, after whom the group is named. YTL Corporation Berhad is an integrated infrastructure developer with extensive operations in countries including Malaysia, Singapore, the United Kingdom, Australia, France, Indonesia, Japan, Jordan, Myanmar, the Netherlands, Thailand and Vietnam. The company has grown from a small construction firm into a global infrastructure company generating over RM18 billion (US$4 billion) in revenues with over 70 percent coming from overseas.

History 

YTL Corporation (YTL Corp) was founded by the late Yeoh Tiong Lay in 1955. His oldest son, Francis Yeoh became the Managing Director of YTL Corp in 1988 and subsequently became Executive Chairman in 2018. Under Francis Yeoh's stewardship, the YTL Group has grown from a single listed entity in 1985 to a group of 5 listed companies with a combined market capitalisation of RM29 billion (US$7 billion) and total assets of RM77 billion (US$18 billion) which includes cash reserves of RM12 billion (US$3 billion). The company is also listed on the Tokyo Stock Exchange since 1996, being the first Asian non-Japanese company to be listed there.

YTL Corp had an annual average compounded growth rate in net profit of 55% over 15 years to 2010. YTL Corp has paid dividends consecutively for the last 39 years. One a group wide basis, all of its listed entities have paid a combined total of RM23 billion in dividends as of December 2019.

Amongst the group's key businesses are utilities, operating and maintenance (O&M) activities, high-speed rail, cement manufacturing, construction contracting, property development, hotels & resorts, technology incubation, real estate investment trust (REIT), and carbon consulting. YTL serves more than 12 million customers across three continents.

In 2010 Malaysian Business Magazine Top 100 Companies survey of Malaysia’s largest listed companies, YTL Corp has emerged as the largest non-government linked company in Malaysia. YTL Corp has also been named as one of the Top 250 Global Energy Companies in Asia under the Platts Top 250 Global Energy Company rankings and also earned a ranking of 15 overall in the Fastest Growing Asian Companies.

Subsidiaries 
YTL's major subsidiaries are YTL Power International Berhad, YTL Cement Berhad, Syarikat Pembinaan Yeoh Tiong Lay Sdn Bhd, YTL Land & Development Berhad, YTL Hotels & Properties Sdn Bhd, YTL e-Solutions Bhd and YTL-SV Carbon Sdn Bhd.

YTL Power International 
YTL Power International Berhad (YTLPI) is the utility subsidiary of YTL Corp. YTLPI owns and operates some 5,500MW of gas, oil and coal-fired power generation plants in Malaysia, Singapore and Indonesia. YTLPI is the first IPP (independent power producer) in Malaysia with two gas-fired combined cycle power plants with a combined capacity of 1,212 MW.  The two plants are located at Paka, Terengganu, and Pasir Gudang, Johor. The licence was awarded after a major power blackout in Malaysia in the mid-1990s, for 21 years and it expired in September 2015. The Paka plant was awarded a supplementary PPA in September 2017 for a period of 3 years and 10 months, expiring in Jun 2021.

YTLPI has a 20% stake in PT Jawa Power, the second largest IPP in Indonesia, which owns a 1,220MW coal-fired power plant located at the Paiton Power Generation Complex in East Java, Indonesia. YTLPI through its wholly owned subsidiary PowerSeraya Limited in Singapore, is the second largest power generation company in terms of installed capacity, with a total licensed capacity of 3,100 MW, and also is an active trader of oil products where it has approximately 1 million m3 of storage capacity.

YTLPI has 100% stake in Wessex Water Services Limited, a water and sewerage services company that serves an area of the south west of England. YTLPI has a one-third stake in ElectraNet S.A. which owns and operates the electricity transmission network in South Australia.

YTLPI also owns a 60% stake in YTL Communications, which has approval from the Malaysian Communications and Multimedia Commission (MCMC) to operate a 4G LTE network using 2.3 GHz and 2.6 GHz spectrum in Malaysia. The network known as YES, rolled out its service on 19 November 2010.

YTL Power International Berhad (YTLPI) on 13 December 2010 signed an agreement in Amman to take a 30% stake in a 470MW Jordanian oil shale power project. The US$2.1 billion IPP project has since been included in China's Belt & Road initiative and YTLPI has increased its stake to 45%. The project is expected to start mining oil shale and generating electricity in June 2020.

YTL Cement 
YTL Cement Bhd is a manufacturer of cement and ready-mix concrete products in Malaysia and recently acquired a 77% stake in Lafarge Malaysia Bhd and renamed it Malayan Cement Bhd. The company acquired the 100% interest of Zhejiang Hangzhou Dama Cement in 2007. It has sold its 100% stake in Zhejiang Hangzhou Dama Cement on 30 April 2021. The group currently has a total of 18 plants and operations in Malaysia, Singapore, China, Vietnam and Myanmar.  YTL Cement was taken private via a share swap exercise with YTL Corp in 2012.

YTL Construction 
YTL Corp's flagship construction arm is 100%-owned SPYTL Sdn Bhd, a "Class A" Malaysian Turnkey contractor, which completed approximately RM7.25 billion (US$2.1bn) worth of contracts on schedule and on budget. It is currently involved in the Gemas-JB double track project which is expected to be completed in Oct 2021.

YTL Land & Development 
YTL Land & Development Bhd (YTL L&D) currently has a land bank of more than 2,000 acres in Malaysia. Its largest project at present is Sentul, an urban renewal project, is a 294-acre residential and commercial development and Malaysia's first private gated park. YTL Land will be also developing Singapore’s Sandy Island and Kasara villas in Sentosa Cove and redeveloping Westwood Apartments on Orchard Boulevard. YTL Land was taken private via a share swap exercise in 2019

YTL Hotels 
YTL Hotels (YTL Hotels & Properties Sdn Bhd) is the hospitality arm of YTL Corp, is involved in both the ownership and management of hotels and resorts and operation of luxury trains in Malaysia, Australia, China, Indonesia, Japan, Thailand, and United Kingdom. It has a total of over 5,000 rooms, over 4,000 of which are in YTL Hospitality REIT, which is listed on the Main Market of Bursa Malaysia Securities Berhad.

The YTL Hotels owns a 462 ha mountain ski resort in Niseko Village in Hokkaido, Japan and plans to develop it into a world-class alpine destination.

In February 2014, the company announced the acquisition of Thermae Development Co Ltd, which holds the licence to operate Thermae Bath Spa complex, located at the Unesco World Heritage City of Bath in the United Kingdom for £12mil (RM65.08mil).

List of Properties 
Australia
 Sydney Harbour Marriott Hotel
 Melbourne Marriott Hotel
 Brisbane Marriott Hotel
 Perth The Westin Hotel

Europe
 Muse Saint-Tropez, France
 Muse Bray Cottages, United Kingdom
 Muse Casa Marbella, Spain
 The Gainsborough Bath Spa Hotel
 Threadneedles Hotel, Autograph Collection
 The Academy Hotel
 The Glasshouse, Autograph Collection
 Monkey Island Estate

Japan
 Higashiyama Niseko Village, a Ritz-Carlton Reserve
 Niseko Village, Hokkaido
 Hilton Niseko Village
 The Green Leaf Niseko Village
 Kasara Niseko Village Townhouse

Malaysia
 The Ritz-Carlton Kuala Lumpur
 The Residences at the Ritz Carlton Kuala Lumpur
 JW Marriott Kuala Lumpur
 Pangkor Laut Resort
 Muse Pangkor Laut Estates
 Tanjong Jara Resort
 Cameron Highlands Resort
 Gaya Island Resort
 The Majestic Hotel Kuala Lumpur
 The Majestic Malacca
 Vistana Hotel Kuala Lumpur
 Vistana Hotel Kuantan
 Vistana Hotel Penang
 Hotel Stripes Kuala Lumpur

Thailand
 The Surin, Phuket.
 The Ritz-Carlton, Koh Samui.

Other Asian countries
 Swatch Art Peace Hotel, Shanghai, China
 Spa Village Resort Tembok Bali, Indonesia

YTL e-Solutions 
YTL Corp undertakes IT and e-commerce initiatives through YTL e-Solutions Bhd, a technology incubator listed on the MESDAQ market of the Bursa Malaysia. Infoscreen Networks PLC is a digital narrowcasting business listed on the Alternative Investment Market of the London Stock Exchange, through YTL Info Screen Sdn Bhd owns and operates four digital narrow cast media networks in the Bukit Bintang area of Kuala Lumpur, and on the Express Rail Link train to Kuala Lumpur International Airport in Malaysia. YTL e-Solutions was taken private in 2016.

YTL-SV Carbon
In 2008, YTL Corp acquired a 75% stake in the Malaysian-based Clean Development Mechanism (CDM) developer, YTL-SV Carbon Sdn Bhd (then known as SV Carbon), which is currently the largest CDM consultancy in Malaysia and the fifth largest in ASEAN with projects in Malaysia, Indonesia, Vietnam and China. The consultancy is headed by Ruth Yeoh.

Acquisitions

ElectraNet Pty Ltd 
In 2000, YTL Power had acquired 33.5% of Australia's ElectraNet Pty Ltd for some RM1.9 billion. ElectraNet which owns and operates the power transmission network in South Australia, under a 200-year power transmission agreement.

Wessex Water 
In May 2002, YTL Power International acquired a 100% stake in Wessex Water for £544.5 million in cash and assumed £695 million of debt. Wessex Water is a regional water and sewerage operator in the United Kingdom, serving parts of south west and southern England. The area covered by Wessex Water includes Dorset, Somerset, Sewerage in Bristol, most of Wiltshire and parts of Gloucestershire and Hampshire.

PT Jawa Power 
In 2004 YTL Power International bought a 35% stake in PT Jawa Power for US$139.4 million from PT Bumipertiwi Tatrapradipta, holding 15%. Another shareholder is Siemens Project Ventures GmbH with 50% of the shares. PT Jawa Power is the second largest independent power producer (IPP) in Indonesia. It has a 1,220MW coal-fired power plant located at the Paiton Power Generation Complex in East Java, Indonesia. PT Jawa Power has a 30-year PPA with PT PLN (Persero), the state-owned electric utility company.

Starhill Global REIT 

In October 2008, YTL Corporation announced that it will acquire 26% stake in Starhill Global REIT (then known as Macquarie Prime REIT) for S$202 million. Based on the acquisition price, it is a 49% discount to its net asset value and estimated dividend yield for 2009 is approximately 9.4%. Starhill Global has a property portfolio comprising two landmark shopping complex in Orchard Road, Singapore — Wisma Atria and Ngee Ann City. In Tokyo, it has seven properties located in the prime areas of Roppongi, Shibuya-ku, Minato-ku and Meguro-ku and also one retail property known as Renhe Spring Zongbei Department Store in Chengdu, China.
The acquisition of David Jones Building in Perth, Australia in the early of 2010, was completed at a purchase price of A$114.5 million. On 28 June 2010, the acquisition of Lot 10 and Starhill Gallery in Kuala Lumpur, Malaysia expanded Starhill Global REIT’s portfolio to 13 assets located in Singapore, China, Japan, Australia and Malaysia.

PowerSeraya 
In December 2008, YTL Power International Bhd announced that it will pay S$3.6bil cash and take on a debt of $201 million for PowerSeraya Ltd. PowerSeraya is the second largest power generation company in Singapore by installed capacity, supply about a quarter of Singapore's total licensed generation capacity. It has a licensed generating capacity of 3,100MW and is situated on Jurong Island, Singapore. Seraya Energy Pte Ltd, a 100% subsidiary of PowerSeraya, had 18% total market share of the Singapore electricity market in 2007.

References

External links 
 

Conglomerate companies of Malaysia
Construction and civil engineering companies of Malaysia
Multinational companies headquartered in Malaysia
Companies based in Kuala Lumpur
Conglomerate companies established in 1955
1955 establishments in Malaya
Malaysian brands
Companies listed on Bursa Malaysia
Yeoh family
Construction and civil engineering companies established in 1955